The 2021 Clemson Tigers baseball team are the varsity intercollegiate baseball team that represented Clemson University during the 2021 NCAA Division I baseball season. The Tigers competed in the Atlantic Coast Conference (ACC) and were led by sixth-year head coach Monte Lee.  Clemson played its home games at Doug Kingsmore Stadium in Clemson, South Carolina.

The Tigers finished the season 25–27 and 16–20 in ACC play to finish in fifth place in the Atlantic Division.  As the eleventh seed in the ACC Tournament they were placed in Pool B with second seed Georgia Tech and seventh seed Louisville.  The Tigers lost to Louisville and defeated Georgia Tech.  Their 1–1 record was not good enough to advance to the Semifinals and they were not invited to the NCAA Tournament.  The Tigers missed the NCAA Tournament for the first time since 2008 and just the second time since 1987.  This was also Clemson's first losing season since 1957.  It was also head coach Monte Lee's first time missing the NCAA Tournament as a head coach.

Previous season
The 2020 season was impacted by the coronavirus pandemic.  On March 12, it was announced that the 2020 NCAA tournament would be canceled due to the pandemic.  Clemson University suspended all events until April 5, 2020. On March 17, the ACC cancelled all spring athletic activities and thereby ended the baseball season. The Tigers finished the season 14–3 and 3–0 in ACC play.

Personnel

Roster

Coaching Staff

Schedule

Note: All rankings shown are from the D1 Baseball poll.

Rankings

2021 MLB Draft

Anglin did not sign and returned to Clemson.

References

Clemson Tigers baseball seasons
Clemson
Clemson baseball